José Manuel Segovia Fernández (born 13 April 1991) is a Spanish footballer who plays for Porcinos (Team in the Kings League) as a goalkeeper.

Football career
Born in L'Hospitalet de Llobregat, Barcelona, Catalonia, Segovia finished his formation with UE Cornellà's youth setup. He moved to Villarreal CF in the summer of 2010, being assigned to the C-team of the Tercera División.

On 19 February 2011, Segovia played his first match as a professional, starting with the reserves in a 2–2 away draw against UD Las Palmas in the Segunda División. On 3 July he was loaned to Segunda División B club UE Llagostera, but after only acting as a backup he moved to UE Olot in November, also on loan.

In July 2012, Segovia signed for third-tier club Burgos CF, but left a month later alleging personal problems. He joined CF Montañesa in October, and continued to compete in the fourth tier in the following years, representing FC Santboià and UE Rubí.

On 12 June 2014, Segovia returned to Cornellà, newly promoted to the Segunda B.

References

External links

1991 births
Living people
Footballers from L'Hospitalet de Llobregat
Spanish footballers
Association football goalkeepers
Segunda División players
Segunda División B players
Tercera División players
Villarreal CF C players
Villarreal CF B players
UE Costa Brava players
UE Olot players
CF Montañesa players
FC Santboià players
UE Cornellà players
AEC Manlleu footballers
UE Sant Andreu footballers